Quanah may refer to:
 Quanah Parker (1840s–1911), Native American leader
 Quanah, Texas